Humberto Primo is a town located in Castellanos Department in the Santa Fe Province of Argentina.

Twin towns
 Faule, Italy

References

Populated places in Santa Fe Province
Populated places established in 1884
1884 establishments in Argentina